Cherry Grove, North Carolina may refer to:
Cherry Grove, Caswell County, North Carolina, an unincorporated community
Cherry Grove, Columbus County, North Carolina, an unincorporated community